Adrian Todd Zuniga (born February 4, 1975) is the founding editor of Opium Magazine, author of the novel Collision Theory, the Writers Guild of America Award-nominated co-writer of Longshot featured in Madden NFL 18, and the co-creator and host of Literary Death Match, a reading series that occurs regularly in over 60 cities worldwide including New York City, San Francisco, London, Los Angeles, and Paris.

He was named a LA Times Face to Watch in 2012.

He created 1UP.com’s Sports Anomaly podcast.

Works 
Collision Theory  Rare Bird Books, 2018,

References

External links 

 Interview of Adrian Todd Zuniga, February 21, 2006 Gothamist.com
 An interview with Adrian Todd Zuniga on Notebook on Cities and Culture

21st-century American novelists
21st-century American non-fiction writers
1975 births
American short story writers
American magazine founders
American magazine editors
American male non-fiction writers
American male short story writers
Living people
Place of birth missing (living people)
21st-century American journalists
21st-century American male writers